Live at Sweetwater Two is a live Hot Tuna album recorded at the same time as the album, Live at Sweetwater, but contains no tracks from the previous release.  The live performances feature Bob Weir of the Grateful Dead, blues-singer Maria Muldaur, and keyboardist Pete Sears. Also included is the previously unreleased studio track "Endless Sleep" from the Pair a Dice Found sessions. In 2004 Eagle Records re-mastered and re-released the album with several added tracks, and without the studio track included.

1993 Relix Records track listing
"Hesitation Blues" (Traditional) – 5:28
"Dime for Beer" (Jelly Roll Morton) – 3:01
"Death Don't Have No Mercy" (Rev. Gary Davis) – 5:23
"99 Year Blues" (Julius Daniels) – 4:54
"San Francisco Bay Blues" (Jesse Fuller) – 4:03
"Blue Moon of Kentucky" (Monroe) – 4:44
"Ain't Got No Home" (Guthrie) – 4:21
"Good Morning Little Schoolgirl" (Traditional) – 5:21
"Third Week in the Chelsea" (Jorma Kaukonen) – 4:34
"My AK-47" (Michael Falzarano) – 5:29
"Parchman Farm" (Mose Allison) – 9:13
"Endless Sleep" (Reynolds) – 3:13

2004 Eagle Records track listing
"Hesitation Blues" (Traditional) – 5:24
"Dime for Beer" (Jelly Roll Morton) – 2:54
"Trial by Fire" (Jorma Kaukonen) – 4:30
"Death Don't Have No Mercy" (Rev. Gary Davis) – 5:23
"99 Year Blues" (Julius Daniels) – 4:54
"San Francisco Bay Blues" (Jesse Fuller) – 4:01
"Too Many Years" (Kaukonen) – 3:47
"Blue Moon of Kentucky" (Monroe) – 4:33
"Ain't Got No Home" (Guthrie) – 4:20
"Good Morning Little Schoolgirl" (Traditional) – 5:16
"Walkin' Blues" (Robert Johnson) – 4:14
"Third Week in the Chelsea" (Kaukonen) – 4:36
"My AK-47" (Michael Falzarano) – 5:29
"Parchman Farm" (Mose Allison) – 7:41
"Folsom Prison Blues" (Johnny Cash) – 6:10

Personnel

Live tracks
Jorma Kaukonen – lead guitar, vocals, Dobro, table steel guitar
Jack Casady – bass
Michael Falzarano – rhythm guitar, vocals, mandolin

Additional personnel
Keith Corsaan (2004 release) – saxophone
Maria Muldaur – vocals, tambourine
Pete Sears – piano, accordion
Happy Traum – guitar, vocals
Bob Weir – guitar, vocals

Studio track
Jorma Kaukonen – lead guitar, rhythm guitar, vocals
Jack Casady – bass
Michael Falzarano – rhythm guitar
Harvey Sorgen – drums

Production
Production team from Jorma's Hillside Farm Productions
Rick Sanchez – engineer
Ira Wilkes – king roadie and production coordination
Remote truck at Sweetwater from The Plant Recording Studios
Gabra Management – management
Steve Martin (William Morris Agency) – booking agent
Vanessa Lillian, Gabra Specialties – design layout
Jorma Kaukonen, Jack Casady – liner notes
Carl Studna – photography
Recorded live at Sweetwater, Mill Valley, CA on January 27 and 28, 1992

References

Hot Tuna live albums
1993 live albums
Relix Records live albums
Eagle Records live albums